The Church of the Divine Unity was a former Unitarian and Universalist church located on the east side of Broadway between Prince and Spring Streets, SoHo, Manhattan. It was built c.1845 and likely transferred to American Unitarian Association after c. 1854. Subsequently, it was adaptively reused as an art gallery (the Düsseldorf Gallery), then an office, and finally was demolished sometime before 1866.

“On August 6, 1866, [prolific diarist George Templeton] Strong observed ‘another material change in the aspect of Broadway:’ ‘Taylor’s showy restaurant” had become the office of the American Express Company, and Capin's Universalist Church, which had been serving as an art gallery, on the east side of Broadway between Prince and Spring Streets, was demolished. Strong, neither an apologist for the past nor a dedicated futurist, took a fatalist view: ‘So things go. Let ‘em go!’

References 

Broadway (Manhattan)
Churches completed in 1845
Churches in Manhattan
Closed churches in New York City
Defunct art museums and galleries in Manhattan
Demolished buildings and structures in Manhattan
Demolished churches in New York City
SoHo, Manhattan
Victorian architecture in New York (state)
Buildings and structures demolished in 1866